The 2013–14 season of the Hessenliga, the highest association football league in the German state of Hesse, was the sixth season of the league at tier five (V) of the German football league system and the 36th season overall since establishment of the league in 1978, then as the Oberliga Hessen.

The season started on 26 July 2013 and finished on 24 May 2014.

No team was promoted from the Hessenliga to the Regionalliga Südwest above as 2013–14 champions TGM SV Jügesheim decided to withdraw from the league while 1. FC Eschborn, the only team to have applied for a Regionalliga licence, later withdrew this application.

Final standings  
The 2013–14 season saw seven new clubs in the league, FC Ederbergland, SV Wiesbaden, TSV Lehnerz and Sportfreunde Seligenstadt, all promoted from the Verbandsligas while FC Bayern Alzenau, 1. FC Eschborn and FSV Frankfurt II had been relegated from the Regionalliga Südwest.

Top goalscorers
The top goal scorers for the season:

Promotion play-offs
Promotion play-offs were held at the end of the season for the Regionalliga.

To the Regionalliga
The runners-up of the Hessenliga, Oberliga Rheinland-Pfalz/Saar and the Oberliga Baden-Württemberg were scheduled to play each other for one more spot in the Regionalliga. The Hessenliga runners-up declined this opportunity leaving just two teams to play off, with FC Nöttingen winning promotion to the Regionalliga:

References

External links 
 Hessenliga on Fupa.net 

Hessenliga seasons
Hessenliga